Up Tight! is an album by saxophonist Gene Ammons recorded in 1961 and released on the Prestige label. The album was recorded at the same sessions that produced Boss Soul!.

Reception
AllMusic reviewer Scott Yanow stated: "His sound and style effectively bridged the gap between bop and soul jazz".

Track listing 
All compositions by Gene Ammons, except where indicated.
 "The Breeze and I" (Ernesto Lecuona, Al Stillman) – 6:25 
 "I Sold My Heart to the Junkman" (Leon René) – 4:30 
 "Moonglow" (Eddie DeLange, Will Hudson, Irving Mills) – 5:02 
 "Up Tight!" – 3:32   
 "The Five O'Clock Whistle" (Kim Gannon, Gene Irwin, Josef Myrow) – 5:56 
 "Jug's Blue Blues" – 8:15  
 "Lester Leaps In" (Lester Young) – 4:10     
Recorded at Van Gelder Studios in Englewood Cliffs, New Jersey on October 17, 1961 (tracks 1, 3, 6 & 7), and October 18, 1961 (tracks 2, 4 & 5)

Personnel 
Gene Ammons – tenor saxophone
Walter Bishop Jr. (tracks 1, 3, 6 & 7), Patti Bown (tracks 2, 4 & 5) – piano 
Art Davis (tracks 1, 3, 6 & 7), George Duvivier (tracks 2, 4 & 5) – bass
Art Taylor – drums
Ray Barretto – congas

References 

Gene Ammons albums
1961 albums
Prestige Records albums
Albums recorded at Van Gelder Studio
Albums produced by Esmond Edwards